Vladimir Valeryevich Salnikov (born 21 May 1960) is a Russian former freestyle swimmer who competed for the Soviet Union and set 12 world records in the 400, 800 and 1,500 meter events. Nicknamed the "Tsar of the Pool" but also the "Monster of the Waves" or simply the "Leningrad Express", he was the first person to swim under fifteen minutes in the 1500 m freestyle and also the first person to swim under eight minutes in the 800 m freestyle. He was named the Male World Swimmer of the Year in 1979 and 1982 by Swimming World.

Career

Born in Leningrad, Soviet Union. Salnikov was the son of a sea captain. When he was seven years old, his mother took him to a swimming pool to join a swimming team. One year later he began to train regularly under the lead of coach. Salnikov trained at Zenit and later at the Armed Forces sports society.

Salnikov made his debut in the Olympic games in 1976 in Montreal, at the age of 16. He broke the European record in the 1,500 m, but finished fifth.

His long sequence of international victories began at the 1977 European Championship where he won the gold medal in his favorite distance, the 1,500 m. At the 1978 World Championship in Berlin, Salnikov won gold medals in the 400 and 1,500 m, setting a new world record in the 400 meters. One year later he set another world record, in the 800 m, becoming the first person to complete the distance in less than eight minutes.

The United States boycotted the 1980 Olympics in Moscow in protest of the Soviet invasion of Afghanistan, but Salnikov demonstrated that he was far superior to everybody, winning the 1500 m race in 14:58.27 and becoming the first person to swim the distance under 15 minutes. He won two more gold medals, in the 4×200 m relay and in the 400 m. At the 1,500 m his target was not just to win the gold, but to break the world record and the 15-minute barrier. During the race, he managed to control his timing by peeking at the clock by the pool side. Salnikov also planned to break the 400 m world record, but failed, and had to settle on the Olympic record. He did not prepare for the 4×200 m relay, and was enlisted to this event by the team managers.

In the early 1980s Salinikov was the absolute ruler of the freestyle races on the longer distances: in 1982 he retained his world titles, and one year later, at the URS Winter Nationals, he set a new world record in the 1,500 m with the time of 14:54.76: the record lasted until 1991, when it was beaten by the German Jörg Hoffmann (Salinikov's record had actually been beaten by Glen Housman in Adelaide in December 1989, but due to a malfunction with the electronic timing, his new record time was disallowed).

The Soviet Union boycotted the 1984 Summer Olympics in Los Angeles, so Salnikov could not defend his title. Salnikov went back to Seoul in 1988, aged 28, when he was considered too old. He had set a world record in 1986 in the 800 m, but since then never returned to his former form: he finished fourth in the 1,500 m at the 1986 world championships, and failed to reach the final at the 1987 European championships. His pre-Olympic results did not meet the standards set for the Soviet Olympic team, and he was included in the team only by intervention of Soviet officials. Salnikov did not fail, and won the 1,500 meters race, though he later admitted that in that race he went flat out and swam the last 20–30 meters in a blackout state. That night when entering the Olympic Village restaurant he was awarded a standing ovation by the other athletes.

His titles also include four World Championship gold medals, four European Championship gold medals and one European Championship silver medal.

Coaches
Igor Koshkin is credited with bringing Salnikov to the world-top level. Later in his career, Salnikov had a brief stay at Mission Viejo in the United States, where he worked with coaches Mark Shubert, Brian Goodell and Tim Shaw. In the mid-1980s, Salnikov parted with Koshkin, who thought that a 25-year-old swimmer had no further prospectives. Since 1984-5, he was coached by his wife Marina, a former Soviet track and field record holder in the 100 meters and a sports psychologist.

After retirement
After the 1988 Olympics Salnikov retired from competitions and until 1990 worked as the head coach of the Soviet swimming team. In parallel, between 1989 and 1991 he acted as vice-president of the Soviet Swimming Federation. In 1991–2001 he worked at the company Olimp and represented Speedo in Russia. In 1984–1990 he was a member of the Soviet Olympic Committee and in 1991–2000 a member of the International Swimming Federation’s (FINA) Athletes’ Commission. In 2009 he was elected president of the Russian Swimming Federation.

Salnikov was awarded the Order of the Red Banner of Labour (1980), Order of Lenin (1985), Order of the October Revolution (1988) and Order of Honour (2010). In 1993 he was inducted to the International Swimming Hall of Fame. He graduated from the Lesgaft Institute of Physical Education in Saint Petersburg and holds a PhD in pedagogy.

Salnikov's 1988 victory in Seoul is mentioned in the 2011 film The Guard. The protagonist, claiming to have finished fourth, says that he aimed for bronze, behind two Germans (Stefan Pfeiffer and Uwe Daßler), but underestimated Salnikov who "was supposed to be over-the-hill". (In reality, fourth place went to Matt Cetlinski.)

See also
 List of members of the International Swimming Hall of Fame
List of multiple Olympic gold medalists at a single Games
List of multiple Olympic gold medalists
World record progression 400 metres freestyle
World record progression 800 metres freestyle
World record progression 1500 metres freestyle

References

External links

1960 births
Living people
World record setters in swimming
Russian male freestyle swimmers
Olympic gold medalists for the Soviet Union
Olympic swimmers of Russia
Olympic swimmers of the Soviet Union
Swimmers from Saint Petersburg
Soviet male swimmers
Swimmers at the 1976 Summer Olympics
Swimmers at the 1980 Summer Olympics
Swimmers at the 1988 Summer Olympics
World Aquatics Championships medalists in swimming
European Aquatics Championships medalists in swimming
Medalists at the 1988 Summer Olympics
Medalists at the 1980 Summer Olympics
Olympic gold medalists in swimming
Universiade medalists in swimming
Universiade gold medalists for the Soviet Union
Medalists at the 1983 Summer Universiade